Bigg Boss 7 also known as Bigg Boss: Jannat Ka Wow Aur Jahannam Ka Aaw Dekhege Saath Saath or simply Bigg Boss: Saath Saat is the seventh season of the Indian reality TV series Bigg Boss which aired on TV channel Colors TV from 15 September 2013, with Salman Khan returning as the host for the fourth time and this season is longer than its predecessor, Bigg Boss 6 and lasted for 15 weeks (104 days) concluding on Saturday, 28 December 2013. The seventh season was launched with the tagline- 'Jannat Ka Wow Aur Jahannam Ka Aaw Dekhege Saath Saath'. The show started airing on 15 September.

The series was won by Indian model and actress Gauahar Khan on 28 December 2013. While Tanishaa Mukerji was runner-up, Ajaz Khan remained 3rd and Sangram Singh remained 4th.

Production

Eye Logo
The season had a realistic eye logo having hell and heaven in the background. The eye featured eyelashes made of fire, red iris and black pupil having white veins in reddish sclera.

House
The contestants were initially divided into two separate sections of the house, one called "Heaven" and the other "Hell." The "Heaven" side of the house included the pool and considerably more luxuries, while residents of the "Hell" side lacked running water and a kitchen of their own. Inmates in "Hell" were forced to rely on the housemates in the "Heaven" side for food and to use a tap outdoors for water. This was revealed to the housemates on launch night, and entrants Tanishaa and Andy were tasked with dividing them into households.

As long as the division lasted, inmates were not permitted to cross the boundaries or, except for food, share items between the two sides. On the 31st day, the "Hell" facility was demolished and all remaining contestants moved to "Heaven."

Broadcast

The series was first broadcast in India on network Colors beginning 15 September 2013. The series was also broadcast in Pakistan on ARY Digital beginning 21 September 2013 and in the United Kingdom on Colors UK on 15 September 2013.

Housemate Status

Housemates
The participants in the order of appearance and entered in house are:

Original entrants
 Tanishaa Mukerji – Hindi, Marathi, Bengali, Telugu and Tamil actress. She is the daughter of Tanuja & Shomu Mukherjee and is the youngest sister to Kajol. She had appeared in films like Neal N Nikki & One Two Three.
 VJ Andy – VJ and reality television host. He has worked as an VJ for Channel V and is also the winner of Life OK's cooking reality show, Welcome – Baazi Mehmaan-Nawaazi Ki.
 Ratan Rajput – Television actress and reality television star. She is well known for her roles in Imagine TV's Radhaa Ki Betiyaan Kuch Kar Dikhayengi & Zee TV's Agle Janam Mohe Bitiya Hi Kijo. She was also a part of reality show, Ratan Ka Rishta.
 Gauahar Khan – Actress, reality TV star, model She participated in Jhalak Dikhhla Jaa 3. She danced in item songs Parda (Once Upon a Time in Mumbaai, Chokra Jawaan and Jhallah Wallah (Ishaqzaade).
 Shilpa Sakhlani – Actress wed to fellow Bigg Boss 7 contestant Apurva Agnihotri. She is known for her roles in Kyunki Saas Bhi Kabhi Bahu Thi as Ganga and Jassi Jaissi Koi Nahin as Vidhi.
 Apoorva Agnihotri – Actor wed to fellow Bigg Boss 7 contestant Shilpa Sakhlani. He did shows like Jassi Jaissi Koi Nahin & Bidaai.
 Kamya Panjabi – Television actress. She is known for her role in Star Plus's Maryada: Lekin Kab Tak?. 
 Hazel Keech – British actress and model who works in India. She danced in Sonu Sood's song Aa Ante from the film Maximum.
 Kushal Tandon – Model turned TV actor. He has been in show Ek Hazaaron Mein Meri Behna Hai along playing the role of Nia Sharma's husband. He also was seen in Nach Baliye 5 with Elena Boeva. 
 Rajat Rawail – Producer, actor
 Sangram Singh – Wrestler and reality television personality.
 Elli Avram – Swedish Greek actress She made her Bollywood debut with the film Mickey Virus opposite Manish Paul. 
 Armaan Kohli – Actor He appeared in many films in the 1990s.
 Pratyusha Banerjee – Actress She was known for her role as Anandi in Colors TV's Balika Vadhu.
 Anita Advani – Anita Advani actress was in the news after Rajesh Khanna's death, claiming to have been his live-in partner.

Wild card entrants
 Asif Azim – Bangladeshi born model.<ref>[http://timesofindia.indiatimes.com/videos/entertainment/tv/Bangladeshi-model-Asif-Azim-to-enter-Bigg-Boss-7/videoshow/23090037.cms Bangladeshi model Asif Azim to enter 'Bigg Boss 7'''], The Times of India. Retrieved 27 October 2013.</ref>
 Vivek Mishra – Model and naked yoga trainer. He gained attention in the media for accusing former housemate Raja Chaudhary for attempting to rape him.Gymnast, Nude Yoga guru and Big Boss Wild Card entrant Vivek Mishra, Namaste India, 18 October 2013. Retrieved 27 October 2013. "[Mishra] is the new wild card entrant into Big Boss season 7.... [F]rom Allahabad, Uttar Pradesh... Vivek is professionally a gymnast who has represented India at many international events and levels...."
 Ajaz Khan – Actor.
 Candy Brar – Former model. She participated in the popular youth show MTV Roadies'' in 2004. She is the former girlfriend of Kushal Tandon. 
 Sofia Hayat – British actress and singer. She has worked on both British and Indian projects.

Twists

Bigg Boss Warden
The Bigg Boss Warden was a new feature for season seven. She monitored inmates and kept them on time.

Allotment

 All the house specifications were given by the first two entrants (Tanisha & Andy) as per the order of Bigg Boss, and the decision for allotment of Tanisha and Andy was opposite to the second last entrants to their allotment, according to Bigg Boss orders.
 Bigg Boss asked the heaven housemates to choose from among them a housemate who is, according to them, ineligible to live on the heaven side. The housemate with the maximum votes is made to swap places with a decided housemate from the hell side inmates. Gauhar, receiving the majority votes, was made to switch sides with Armaan.
 Housemates decided by mutual consensus the names of the two housemates, from both sides, they would like to move. Hell housemates chose Gauhar and Kushal and heaven housemates Andy and Sangram.
Bigg Boss asked housemates from both sides to decide by mutual consensus the name of one best and worst performer from their side. All inmates except the worst performer, from hell, and the best performer, from heaven, were made to switch sides. All housemates except Shilpa and Elli switched sides.
 Bigg Boss asked Kamya, being the house captain and immune from house-side switch, to name one housemate from heaven who had the greatest contribution in the luxury budget task. Simultaneously Armaan was to name two hell housemates who contributed the least in the task. Kamya chose Andy and Armaan himself and Kushal. All housemates except the names ones were to swap sides. However, during the swap ceremony Bigg Boss asked each switching hell housemate to swap positions with one heaven inmate. Pratyusha, after not being chosen by any hell-mate was spared the switch. Later, using the wishing wall, Kamya, Pratyusha and Tanisha wished for Armaan to be transferred to heaven. Bigg Boss fulfilling the wish asked these three to name one housemate to swap Armaan with. They chose Andy.
 All hell mates were shifted to the heaven side as the hell was completely destroyed. Bigg Boss also announced that the heaven side was the "Bigg Boss House" now.
 Two new contestants (Ajaz & Candy) entered the Bigg Boss Caravan.
 Ajaz and Candy were first shifted to the Main House. Later, Andy was moved to the Bigg Boss Caravan as he was earlier selected by the captain (Kushal) for discussing and plotting nominations (12, 13) which was a violation of Bigg Boss rule. New contestant Sofia also entered the Caravan. 
 Andy was moved back to the Main House along with Sofia.

Guest appearances

Nomination  table

  indicates that the Housemate is directly nominated either for eviction or for snug.
  indicates that the Housemate is granted immunity from nominations
  Moved to the Caravan

Notes
: Only the housemates living on the Heaven side had the right to nominate. However they could only nominate housemates living on the Hell side.
: The captain was given a special power to nominate one heaven housemate which will place them directly up for eviction.
: In a twist to nominations housemates were told to nominate two housemates they would like to save from eviction.
: All the housemates held the right to nominate. Everyone except the House Captain was subject to facing the public vote.
: For week four captain nominations occur before the end of previous captaincy reign, as Tanishaa was moved to hell side and lost her captaincy ship according to rules. 
: All housemates had the right to nominate but they could only nominate housemates living on their side of the house.
: Tanishaa was not eligible for voting as Ratan was given a special power upon her eviction by which she could select any member and deny them the right to nominate.
: House captain held a special right to save one nominated housemate and replace him/her with another housemate who was not put up for eviction by the housemates that week.
: Shilpa was given a special power to nominate one housemate which will place them directly up for eviction.
: Due to the misbehaviour of Tanishaa towards Kushal in the Luxury Budget Task, and due to this Kushal trying to get out of the house, Bigg Boss nominated both of them. 
: The winning team in the Luxury Budget Task and the captain had to nominate two people for eviction.
: For Week 7 nominations, Bigg Boss asked the captain to name five contestants who were discussing and plotting nominations which was a violation of Bigg Boss rule.
: Out of the five the captain had to select one such person who discussed the most and he would be directly evicted at a later date.

References

External links

2013 Indian television seasons
07